Eben Moglen (born 1959) is an American legal scholar who is professor of law and legal history at Columbia University, and is the founder, Director-Counsel and Chairman of Software Freedom Law Center.

Professional biography
Moglen started out as a computer programming language designer and then received his bachelor's degree from Swarthmore College in 1980. In 1985, he received a Master of Philosophy in history and a JD from Yale University.  He has held visiting appointments at Harvard University, Tel Aviv University and the University of Virginia since 1987.

He was a law clerk to Justice Thurgood Marshall (1986–87 term). He joined the faculty of Columbia Law School in 1987, and was admitted to the New York bar in 1988. He received a Ph.D. in history from Yale University in 1993. Moglen serves as a director of the Public Patent Foundation.

Moglen was part of Philip Zimmermann's defense team, when Zimmermann was being investigated over the export of Pretty Good Privacy, a public key encryption system, under US export laws.

In 2003 he received the EFF Pioneer Award. In February 2005, he founded the Software Freedom Law Center.

Moglen was closely involved with the Free Software Foundation, serving as general counsel from 1994 to 2016 and board member from 2000 to 2007. As counsel, Moglen was tasked with enforcing the GNU General Public License (GPL) on behalf of the FSF, and later became heavily involved with drafting version 3 of the GPL. On April 23, 2007 he announced in a blog post that he would be stepping down from the board of directors of the Free Software Foundation. Moglen stated that after the GPLv3 Discussion Draft 3 had been released, he wanted to devote more time to writing, teaching, and the Software Freedom Law Center.

Freedom Box Foundation
In February 2011, Moglen created the Freedom Box Foundation to design software for a very small server called the FreedomBox. The FreedomBox aims to be an affordable personal server which runs only free software, with a focus on anonymous and secure communication. FreedomBox launched version 0.1 in 2012.

Stances on free software

Moglen says that free software is a fundamental requirement for a democratic and free society in which we are surrounded by and dependent upon technical devices. Only if controlling these devices is open to all via free software, can we balance power equally.

Moglen's Metaphorical Corollary to Faraday's Law is the idea that the information appearance and flow between the human minds connected via the Internet works like electromagnetic induction. Hence Moglen's phrase "Resist the resistance!" (i.e. remove anything that inhibits the flow of information).

Statements and perspectives

Moglen believes the idea of proprietary software is as ludicrous as having "proprietary mathematics" or "proprietary geometry". This would convert the subjects from "something you can learn" into "something you must buy", he has argued. He points out that software is among the "things which can be copied infinitely over and over again, without any further costs".

Moglen has criticized what he calls the "reification of selfishness". He has said, "A world full of computers which you can't understand, can't fix and can't use (because it is controlled by inaccessible proprietary software) is a world controlled by machines."

He has called on lawyers to help the Free Software movement, saying: "Those who want to share their code can make products and share their work without additional legal risks." He urged his legal colleagues, "It's worth giving up a little in order to produce a sounder ecology for all. Think kindly about the idea of sharing."

Moglen has criticized trends which result in "excluding people from knowledge". On the issue of free software versus proprietary software, he has argued that "much has been said by the few who stand to lose". Moglen calls for a "sensible respect for both the creators and users" of software code. In general, this concept is a part of what Moglen has termed a "revolution" against the privileged owners of media, distribution channels, and software. On March 13, 2009, in a speech given at Seattle University, Moglen said of the free software movement that, When everybody owns the press, then freedom of the press belongs to everybody' seems to be the inevitable inference, and that's where we are moving, and when the publishers get used to that, they'll become us, and we'll become them, and the first amendment will mean: 'Congress shall make no law ... abridging freedom of speech, or of the press ...', not – as they have tended to argue in the course of the 20th century – 'Congress shall make no law infringing the sacred right of the Sulzbergers to be different'."

On the subject of digital rights management, Moglen said in 2006, "We also live in a world in which the right to tinker is under some very substantial threat. This is said to be because movie and record companies must eat. I will concede that they must eat. Though, like me, they should eat less."

See also 

 List of law clerks of the Supreme Court of the United States (Seat 10)

References

External links

Eben Moglen's webpage at Columbia University

Law clerks of the Supreme Court of the United States
Members of the Free Software Foundation board of directors
American legal scholars
GNU people
Columbia University faculty
Yale Law School alumni
Swarthmore College alumni
Harvard University staff
University of Virginia School of Law faculty
Copyright scholars
Copyright activists
American lawyers
American bloggers
Living people
Columbia Law School faculty
1959 births
Free software people
Articles containing video clips